Bradley Steffens (born February 10, 1955) is an American poet, playwright, novelist, and author of more than sixty nonfiction books for children and young adults.

Early professional work
In the mid-1970s Steffens self-published two chapbooks of his poetry, which he sold on the streets of Southern
California. In 1976, the City of Laguna Beach, California, denied Steffens a permit to sell his works within the
city limits, touching off brouhaha in the local press. Steffens went to court, seeking relief under the First Amendment, but the court ruled in favor of the city. Steffens turned to writing a series of one-act plays-in-verse,
which were professionally produced as “Herod the Great: A Sequence of Pageants” by the Olympia Arts Ensemble
in Minneapolis in 1981 with Michael Yonkers in the title role. Noel Bredahl of the St. Paul Post-Dispatch hailed
the play as "an awesome creation on the part of the playwright. David Hawley, also of the St. Paul Post Dispatch, wrote, “Steffens is a powerful, talented artist."

Writing career

Steffens has published more than fifty poems over the last forty years. His poems have appeared widely in literary journals, including Crosscurrents, Loonfeather, Stone Country, Sidewalks, The Bellingham Review, River Bottom, The Worcester Review, The Birmingham Review, Black Buzzard Review, The Lake Street Review, Plains Poetry Journal, The White Rock Review, The Ball State University Forum, San Diego Writers’ Monthly, Encore, and Farmer’s Market.  He has received many awards for his poetry, including the Emerging Voices Award presented by The Loft Literary Center in Minneapolis and the Lake Superior Writing Competition Award sponsored by the Duluth Public Library. While working as a freelance proofreader
for Lucent Books in 1989, Steffens wrote his first nonfiction book for children, Animal Rights. Over the next thirty-two years, he wrote fifty more books for children and young adults, coauthored seven, and edited the 2004 anthology The Free Speech Movement. His works have been praised by Booklist, School Library Journal, Kirkus Reviews, and Children’s Literature. The Fountain called his Ibn al-Haytham: First Scientist a “beautiful work about Ibn al-Haytham and his advancement of experimental science.” In December 2021, Kirkus Reviews named his The Dark Side of Social Media one of the Best YA Nonfiction Books of 2021.

Steffens is a two-time recipient of the San Diego Book Award for Best Young Adult & Children's Nonfiction. His Giants won the 2005 award and his J.K. Rowling received the 2007 prize. J.K. Rowling also earned Steffens the Theodor S. Geisel Award for the best published book by a San Diego County author in 2007. His Ibn al-Haytham: First Scientist was excerpted in Discovery Channel Magazine in March 2010. He was the keynote speaker at the Southeast Regional Conference of The Islamic Medical Association of North America, the Sixth Annual Meeting
of the Muslim Public Affairs Council of Western New York, the Pacifica Institute, and Women in Dialogue.

Selected works

Steffens is best known for his 2017 historical novel The Prisoner of Al Hakim, which tells the story of the eleventh-century Islamic mathematician Alhasan Ibn al-Haytham. The Fountain commented, "From the very first page Steffens brilliantly brings Alhasan’s internal character to life on the page, sketching a conflicted, fascinating portrait of a reluctant hero. It’s not easy to dramatize the acts of thinking and creating—and harder still to do so in a subtle, elegant style—yet Steffens manages the trick." Blue Minaret praised the book, stating: “The story of Ibn al-Haytham has now been fictionalized masterfully by Bradley Steffens. Each character is well-crafted and in-depth. Each chapter is action-packed. Fans of history will appreciate the descriptions of Cairo and Basra, the esteemed House of Wisdom, even the deserts forming the backdrop of the book. There are plenty of women with strong, independent spirits, and many men in whose hearts burns the love of both God and science.” Wardah Books observed: "This period novel dating back to the Abbasid and Fatimid Caliphate brings to the fore an oft-forgotten side of polymaths such as Alhasan Ibn al-Haytham, as a person who, like all of us, experiences doubt, fear and love.”

Author
Social Media (Thinking Critically). San Diego: ReferencePoint Press, 2022. 
Screen Addiction: A Teen Epidemic. San Diego: ReferencePoint Press, 2022. 
Teen Suicide on the Rise (Mental Health Crisis). San Diego: ReferencePoint Press, 2022. 
The Art and Artists of Anime (All About Anime and Manga). San Diego: ReferencePoint Press, 2022. 
The Science of Infectious Diseases. San Diego: ReferencePoint Press, 2022. 
The Dark Side of Social Media. San Diego: ReferencePoint Press, 2022. 
First Scientist: Ibn Al-Haytham. Clifton, NJ: Blue Dome Press, 2021. 
Health, Illness, and Death in the Time of COVID-19 (Understanding the COVID-19 Pandemic). San Diego: ReferencePoint Press, 2021. 
Esports and the New Gaming Culture. San Diego: ReferencePoint Press, 2020. 
Medical Drones (World of Drones). San Diego: ReferencePoint Press, 2020. 
Social Media Deception (Risks of Social Media). San Diego: ReferencePoint Press, 2020. 
Social Media Addiction (Risks of Social Media). San Diego: ReferencePoint Press, 2020. 
Marijuana Risks (Drug Risks). San Diego: ReferencePoint Press, 2020. 
J. Cole (Giants of Rap and Hip-Hop). San Diego: ReferencePoint Press, 2020. *J. Cole (Giants of Rap and Hip-Hop). San Diego: ReferencePoint Press, 2020. 
Drake (Giants of Rap and Hip-Hop). San Diego: ReferencePoint Press, 2020. 
Addicted to Video Games (Addicted). San Diego: ReferencePoint Press, 2020. 
The Suicide Epidemic. San Diego: ReferencePoint Press, 2020. 
The Science and Technology of Basketball (The Science and Technology of Sports). San Diego: ReferencePoint Press, 2020. 
Gun Violence (Emerging Issues in Public Health). San Diego: ReferencePoint Press, 2020. 
Cell Phone Addiction (Emerging Issues in Public Health). San Diego: ReferencePoint Press, 2020. 
Fossil Fuels (Thinking Critically). San Diego: ReferencePoint Press, 2019. 
Genetic Testing and Research (Thinking Critically). San Diego: ReferencePoint Press, 2019. 
Gun Violence and Mass Shootings. San Diego: ReferencePoint Press, 2019. 
Policing (Threats to Civil Liberties). San Diego: ReferencePoint Press, 2019. 
Privacy (Threats to Civil Liberties). San Diego: ReferencePoint Press, 2019. 
How the Internet Is Changing the World. San Diego: ReferencePoint Press, 2019. 
Teen Suicide (Thinking Critically). San Diego: ReferencePoint Press, 2019. 
Cell Phones (Thinking Critically). San Diego: ReferencePoint Press, 2018. 
Genocide (Human Rights in Focus). San Diego: ReferencePoint Press, 2017. 
Torture (Human Rights in Focus). San Diego: ReferencePoint Press, 2017. 
The Prisoner of Al-Hakim. Clifton, NJ: Blue Dome Press, 2017. 
Securing Cyberspace (Real-World STEM). San Diego: ReferencePoint Press, 2017. 
Eliminate the Threat of Nuclear Terror (Real-World STEM). San Diego: ReferencePoint Press, 2017. 
Big Data Analyst (Cutting Edge Careers). San Diego: ReferencePoint Press, 2017. 
Biomedical Engineer (Cutting Edge Careers). San Diego: ReferencePoint Press, 2017. 
Careers in Medical Technology (High-Tech Careers). San Diego: ReferencePoint Press, 2017. 
Careers in Internet Technology (High-Tech Careers). San Diego: ReferencePoint Press, 2017. 
Is Marijuana Harmful? (Issues in Society). San Diego: ReferencePoint Press, 2016. 
Cutting Edge Internet Technology (Cutting Edge Technology).  San Diego: ReferencePoint Press, 2016. 
Free Speech (Ripped from the Headlines). Yankton, SD: Erickson Press, 2007.  
Ibn al-Haytham: First Scientist (Profiles in Science). Greensboro, NC: Morgan Reynolds Publishing, 2007. 
J.K. Rowling (People in the News). San Diego: Lucent Books, 2007. 
Giants (Monsters). San Diego: Kidhaven Press, 2006. 
Censorship (Overview Series). San Diego: Lucent Books, 2004. 
J.K. Rowling (People in the News). San Diego: Lucent Books, 2002.   
Understanding Of Mice and Men (Understanding Great Literature). San Diego: Lucent Books, 2002.   
Furman v. Georgia (Famous Trials). San Diego: Lucent Books, 2001. 
Censorship (Opposing Viewpoints Digests). San Diego: Greenhaven Press, 2001.   
Emily Dickinson (The Importance Of). San Diego: Lucent Books, 1998.   
Censorship (Overview Series). San Diego: Lucent Books, 1995.   
Loch Ness Monster (Exploring the Unknown). San Diego: Greenhaven Press, 1995.   
Addiction (Opposing Viewpoints Juniors). San Diego: Greenhaven Press, 1994. 
The Fall of the Roman Empire (Great Mysteries). San Diego: Greenhaven Press, 1994. 
Free Speech (Opposing Viewpoints Juniors). San Diego: Greenhaven Press, 1992.   
Phonograph (Encyclopedia of Discovery and Invention). San Diego: Lucent Books, 1992.   
Photography (Encyclopedia of Discovery and Invention). San Diego: Lucent Books, 1991. 
The Children’s Crusade (World Disasters). San Diego: Lucent Books, 1991.   
Printing Press (Encyclopedia of Discovery and Invention). San Diego: Lucent Books, 1990. 
Working Mothers (Opposing Viewpoints Juniors). San Diego: Greenhaven Press, 1989. 
Animal Rights (Opposing Viewpoints Juniors). San Diego: Greenhaven Press, 1989. 
From the Laguna Beach Pageant of the Masters: An Anonymous Romance of Theatric Space... and Six Anonymous Songs. San Rafael: Sack Back Publications, 1976.
From an Eighteenth Century Painted Tile and Other Poems. San Francisco: Sack Back Publications, 1975.

Coauthor
With Don Nardo, Cyclops (Monsters). San Diego: Kidhaven Press, 2005. 
With Don Nardo, Medusa (Monsters). San Diego: Kidhaven Press, 2005.   
With Craig Staples, The Trial of Charles Manson (Famous Trials). San Diego: Lucent Books, 2002.   
With Diana Saenger, Life as a Vietnam POW (American War Library). San Diego: Lucent Books, 2001. 
With Robyn M. Weaver, Cartoonists (History Makers). San Diego: Lucent Books, 2000. 
With Dan Woog, Jesse Jackson (People in the News). San Diego: Lucent Books, 2000. 
With James House, The San Francisco Earthquake (World Disasters). San Diego: Lucent Books, 1989.

Editor
Free Speech Movement (American Social Movements). San Diego: Greenhaven Press, 2004.

References

1955 births
Living people
American male writers